Bedihošť is a municipality and village in Prostějov District in the Olomouc Region of the Czech Republic. It has about 1,100 inhabitants.

History
The first written mention of Bedihošť is from 1275.

Sights
Main sights are the Chapel of Saint Wenceslaus and the Chapel of Saint Florian.

References

External links

Villages in Prostějov District